Edward Bowles may refer to:

Edward Augustus Bowles (1865–1954), English horticulturalist
Edward Bowles (minister) (1613–1662), English Presbyterian minister